Futebol Clube da Lixa known as FC Lixa is a Portuguese football club from Lixa which was founded in 1934. They currently play in the Portuguese Second Division Serie A and last season they finished 14th place 2007/08. They currently play their home games in Senhor do Amparo with a capacity of 6,000. Their current chairman is Manuel Carvalho and their manager is Zeca Lopes.

Season to season

Current squad

Former players

  Wesley John - Saint Vincent and the Grenadines international who played in Portugal for 23 years, including for clubs Ribeira Brava and Porto da Cruz, both below the Portuguese fourth tier)

References

External links 
 FC Lixa official site (Portuguese)

Association football clubs established in 1934
Football clubs in Portugal
1934 establishments in Portugal